Microcosmodontidae is a poorly preserved family of fossil mammals within the extinct order Multituberculata. Representatives are known from the Lower Paleocene of North America. The family is part of the suborder Cimolodonta. Other than that, their systematic relationships are hard to define.

These microcosmodontids were rather small and had a "large lower incisor with a restricted enamel band, (Kielan-Jaworowska & Hurum 2001, p.417). This grouping has also be seen as Microcosmodontinae Holtzman & Wolberg, 1977, within Eucosmodontidae. However, "Microcosmodontidae (new rank assigned by Fox to the subfamily Microcosmodontinae)," (Kielan-Jaworowska & Hurum, 2001).

References 
 Holtzman & Wolberg (1977), "The Microcosmodontinae and Microcosmodon woodi, new multituberculate taxa (Mammalia) from the Late Paleocene of North America". Sci. Publi. of the Sci. Museum of Minnesota, New Series, r, p. 1-13.
 Fox (1999), "The monophyly of the Taeniolabidoidea (Mammalia: Multituberculata)", p. 26 in Leanza (ed.). Abstracts, VII International Symposium on Mesozoic Terrestrial Ecosystems, Buenos Aires, pp. 64.
 Kielan-Jaworowska Z & Hurum JH (2001), "Phylogeny and Systematics of Multituberculate Mammals". Paleontology 44, p. 389-429.
 Much of this information has been derived from  MESOZOIC MAMMALS; Eucosmodontidae, Microcosmodontidae and Taeniolabidoidea, an Internet directory.

Cimolodonts
Late Cretaceous first appearances
Paleocene extinctions
Prehistoric mammal families